The Walnut Street Historic District  is a national historic district located at the northern end of Augusta, St. Charles County, Missouri. The District includes residential and commercial buildings constructed from the mid-19th to mid-20th centuries. Although there have been some minor modifications, the District appears as it did when the town was founded, and many buildings are still owned by descendants of German settlers. Located in the district is the separately listed Staudinger-Grumke House-Store.

It was added to the National Register of Historic Places in 1994.

References

Historic districts on the National Register of Historic Places in Missouri
Queen Anne architecture in Missouri
Bungalow architecture in Missouri
Buildings and structures in St. Charles County, Missouri
National Register of Historic Places in St. Charles County, Missouri